Tetramerium is a genus of plants belonging to the family Acanthaceae. It is found mainly in the Americas, especially in tropical dry forests.

Species
There are approximately 60 species in the genus :

 Tetramerium abditum
 Tetramerium angustius
 Tetramerium aureum
 Tetramerium butterwickianum
 Tetramerium calderonii
 Tetramerium coeruleum
 Tetramerium costatum
 Tetramerium crenatum
 Tetramerium denudatum
 Tetramerium diffusum
 Tetramerium emilyanum
 Tetramerium flavum
 Tetramerium fruticosum
 Tetramerium geniculatum
 Tetramerium glandulosum
 Tetramerium glutinosum
 Tetramerium gualanense
 Tetramerium guerrerense
 Tetramerium hillii
 Tetramerium hintonii
 Tetramerium hispidum
 Tetramerium jasminoides
 Tetramerium langlassei
 Tetramerium latifolium
 Tetramerium leptocaule
 Tetramerium macrostachyum
 Tetramerium macvaughii
 Tetramerium mcvaughii
 Tetramerium montevidense
 Tetramerium multiflorum
 Tetramerium nemorum
 Tetramerium nervosum
 Tetramerium oaxacanum
 Tetramerium obovatum
 Tetramerium ochoterenae
 Tetramerium occidentale
 Tetramerium odoratissimum
 Tetramerium oleaefolium
 Tetramerium ovalifolium
 Tetramerium ovatum
 Tetramerium paniculatum
 Tetramerium peruvianum
 Tetramerium platystegium
 Tetramerium polystachyum
 Tetramerium racemulosum
 Tetramerium rubrum
 Tetramerium rzedowskii
 Tetramerium sagasteguianum
 Tetramerium scabrum
 Tetramerium scorpioides
 Tetramerium sessilifolium
 Tetramerium standleyi
 Tetramerium stipulaceum
 Tetramerium surcubambense
 Tetramerium tenuissimum
 Tetramerium tetramerioides
 Tetramerium torreyella
 Tetramerium wasshausenii
 Tetramerium yaquianum
 Tetramerium zeta

References

External links
 Tetramerium on mobot.org
 Germplasm Resources Information Network (GRIN)

Acanthaceae
Acanthaceae genera
Taxa named by Christian Gottfried Daniel Nees von Esenbeck